Olga Vladimirovna Skabeyeva or Skabeeva (born 11 December 1984) is a Russian television presenter, political commentator, and propagandist. Skabeyeva received the nickname "Iron Doll of Putin TV" due to her criticism of the Russian opposition.

Early life and education 
Skabeyeva was born in 1984 in Volzhsky, Volgograd Oblast, Russian SFSR, Soviet Union. At first, she studied at a private Russian-American school, and then moved to a general secondary school, from which she graduated with honors.

In the tenth grade, she decided to become a journalist. She studied at the Faculty of Journalism at Saint Petersburg State University, where she graduated from with honors in 2008. Her journalistic career began at a local newspaper.

Career 
Skabeyeva rose to prominence in 2012–2013 with her coverage of the Pussy Riot trial, the concurrent surge in anti-government rallies and subsequent criminal investigations into the activities of Russian opposition supporters. Her critical reports of the Russian opposition prompted TV critic  to describe her as a member of Russian state TV's "special operation forces", and her tone as "prosecutorial and accusatory".

Since 2015–2016, Skabeyeva has hosted the author's program Vesti.doc on the Russia-1 state TV channel. Since 12 September 2016, together with husband Yevgeny Popov, she has hosted the 60 Minut (60 minutes), a social and political talk show on Russia-1, billed as a discussion program on high-profile topics.

In 2018, Skabeyeva was involved in an attempt to discredit the British investigation into the poisoning of Sergei and Yulia Skripal. Her television program said the Skripal poisoning case was 'an elaborate British plot to smear Russia'.

According to an Anti-Corruption Foundation (FBK) investigation published 29 July 2021, Skabeyeva and her husband Yevgeny Popov own real estate in Moscow with a total value of over 300 million rubles ($4 million). A 2020 investigation by The Insider website found that Skabeyeva officially earns 12.8 million rubles a year, and her husband 12.9 million. Their only reported sources of income are the state-owned media holding VGTRK and its subsidiary TV channel Russia-1.

Skabeyeva is a two-time winner of the Russian television TEFI Award, receiving the distinction in 2017 and 2018.

She called the 2022 Russian invasion of Ukraine an effort "to protect the people of Donbas from a Nazi regime" and said it was "without exaggeration, a crucial junction in history". On 15 April 2022, she reacted to the sinking of the Russian cruiser Moskva by the Ukrainian forces, saying "One can safely call that it has escalated into World War III". On 24 February 2023, the United States Department of State imposed financial sanctions on Skabeyeva owing. In a press release, the State Department described them as "hosts of a Russian talk show where they predominately disseminate pro-Russia propaganda for the war against Ukraine."

References

External links 

 
 Olga Skabeyeva at the Zvezda television channel
 Russia: Trump's chaos means 'we will finally defeat America'

1984 births
Living people
People from Volzhsky, Volgograd Oblast
Russian propagandists
Russian women journalists
Russian television personalities
Saint Petersburg State University alumni
21st-century Russian journalists
Russian individuals subject to European Union sanctions
Sanctioned due to Russo-Ukrainian War